Jean-Claude Bouillon (27 December 1941 – 31 July 2017) was a French actor. He appeared in more than eighty films from 1966 until 2015.

Filmography

References

Footnotes

Sources

External links
 

1941 births
2017 deaths
People from Épinay-sur-Seine
Male actors from Marseille
French male film actors
French male television actors